Roland Winters (born Roland Winternitz; November 22, 1904 – October 22, 1989) was an American actor who played many character parts in films and television but today is best remembered for portraying Charlie Chan in six films in the late 1940s.

Early years
Winters was born Roland Winternitz on November 22, 1904, in Boston, Massachusetts, the son of Antoinette (Iversen) and Felix Winternitz, a violinist and composer who was teaching at New England Conservatory of Music. His father was born in Austria and his mother in Germany.

Charlie Chan films

Monogram Pictures selected Winters to replace Sidney Toler in the Charlie Chan film series.

Winters was 44 when he made the first of his six Chan films, The Chinese Ring in 1947. His other Chan films were Docks of New Orleans (1948), Shanghai Chest (1948), The Golden Eye (1948), The Feathered Serpent (1948), and Sky Dragon (1949). He also had character roles in three other feature films while he worked on the Chan series.

Yunte Huang, in Charlie Chan: The Untold Story of the Honorable Detective and His Rendezvous with American History, noted differences in the actors' appearances, especially that Winters's "tall nose simply could not be made to look Chinese." Huang also cited the actor's age, writing, "at the age of forty-four, he also looked too young to resemble a seasoned Chinese sage." Keye Luke, who played Chan's son opposite Winters, was actually five months older than Winters.

Roland Winters is considered by some fans to be the least effective of the Chan impersonators, but other observers are quick to defend Winters's portrayals. Ken Hanke wrote in his book Charlie Chan at the Movies: History, Filmography, and Criticism: "Roland Winters has never received his due ... Winters brought with him a badly needed breath of fresh air to the series." He cited "the richness of the approach and the verve with which the series was being tackled" during the Winters era." Similarly, Howard M. Berlin, in his book, Charlie Chan's Words of Wisdom, commented that "Winters brought a much needed breath of fresh air to the flagging film series with his self-mocking, semi-satirical interpretation of Charlie, which is very close to the Charlie Chan in Biggers' novels."

Later films and television
After the series finished, Winters continued to work in film and television until 1982. He was in the movies So Big and Abbott and Costello Meet the Killer, Boris Karloff, and played Elvis Presley's father in Blue Hawaii and a judge in the Elvis film Follow That Dream. He made appearances as the boss on the early TV series Meet Millie, guest-starred in a 1965 episode ("Anywhere I Hang My Hat Is Home") of The Cara Williams Show, and made appearances in the courtroom drama Perry Mason. In 1965 he played as murderer Archer Bryant in "The case of the Telltale Tap". In one 1968 episode of the television series Bewitched ("Man of the Year"), he played the normally unseen McMann of McMann and Tate. He also portrayed Mr. Gimbel in Miracle on 34th Street in 1973.

Death
Winters died at the age of 84 as the result of a stroke at the Actor's Fund Nursing Home in Englewood, New Jersey on October 22, 1989.

Selected filmography

 Citizen Kane (1941) – Newspaperman at Trenton Town Hall (uncredited)
 13 Rue Madeleine (1946) – Van Duyval (uncredited)
 The Chinese Ring (1947) – Charlie Chan
 Docks of New Orleans (1948) – Charlie Chan
 Shanghai Chest (1948) – Charlie Chan
 The Golden Eye (1948) – Charlie Chan
 Cry of the City (1948) – Ledbetter
 The Return of October (1948) – Colonel Wood
 Kidnapped (1948) – Capt. Hoseason
 The Feathered Serpent (1948) – Charlie Chan
 Tuna Clipper (1949) – E.J. Ransom
 Sky Dragon (1949) – Charlie Chan
 Abbott and Costello Meet the Killer, Boris Karloff (1949) – T. Hanley Brooks
 Once More, My Darling (1949) – Colonel Head
 A Dangerous Profession (1949) – Jerry McKay
 Malaya (1949) – Bruno Gruber
 Guilty of Treason (1950) – Soviet Comissar Belov
 Captain Carey, U.S.A. (1950) – Manfredo Acuto
 Killer Shark (1950) – Jeffrey White
 Underworld Story (1950) – Stanley Becker
 Convicted (1950) – Vernon Bradley, Attorney
 Between Midnight and Dawn (1950) – Leo Cusick
 To Please a Lady (1950) – Dwight Barrington
 The West Point Story (1950) – Harry Eberhart
 Sierra Passage (1950) – Sam Cooper
 Inside Straight (1951) – Alexander Tomson
 Raton Pass (1951) – Sheriff Périgord
 Follow the Sun (1951) – Dr. Graham
 She's Working Her Way Through College (1952) – Fred Copeland
 A Lion Is in the Streets (1953) – Prosecutor (uncredited)
 So Big (1953) – Klaas Pool
 Bigger Than Life (1956) – Dr. Ruric
 Top Secret Affair (1957) – Sen. Burdick
 Jet Pilot (1957) – Col. Sokolov
 Never Steal Anything Small (1959) – Doctor
 The Iceman Cometh (1960 - TV) - Jimmy Tomorrow
 Everything's Ducky (1961) – Capt. Lewis Bollinger
 Blue Hawaii (1961) – Fred Gates
 Follow That Dream (1962) – Judge
 Loving (1970) – Plommie
 Miracle on 34th Street (1973, TV Movie) – Mr. Gimbel
 The Dain Curse (1978, TV Mini-Series) – Hubert Collinson

References

External links

1904 births
1989 deaths
American male film actors
American male radio actors
American male television actors
American male stage actors
Male actors from Boston
20th-century American male actors
American people of Austrian descent
American people of German descent